This article is a list of historic places in Charlotte County, New Brunswick entered on the Canadian Register of Historic Places, whether they are federal, provincial, or municipal. For listings in St. Andrews, see List of historic places in St. Andrews, New Brunswick.

List of historic places outside St. Andrews

See also

 List of historic places in New Brunswick
 List of National Historic Sites of Canada in New Brunswick

References

Charlotte County, New Brunswick
Historic